Ken Worpole (born 1944) is a writer and social historian whose many books include works of literary criticism, architectural history, and landscape aesthetics, and was one of the editors of the 2001 United Nations Centre for Human Settlements (UNCHS) report, The State of the World’s Cities. In 2005 The Independent newspaper stated that: ‘For many years, Ken Worpole has been one of the shrewdest and sharpest observers of the English social landscape.’ In 2014 ICON Review similarly observed that ‘For well over 40 years Ken Worpole has been one of the most eloquent and forward thinking writers in Britain.’

Early life 
Worpole attended Southend High School for Boys before training as an English teacher at Brighton College of Education between 1965 and 1969. On completing his training, he moved to Hackney, teaching English at Hackney Downs School from 1969 to 1973. He has been married to the photographer Larraine Worpole since 1965 and they have two children.

Career 
On leaving teaching Worpole worked as an oral historian and publisher for the Centerprise project in Hackney. In 1984 he was appointed Director of the Cultural Industries Unit at the Greater London Enterprise Board, leaving in 1986 when the Greater London Council was abolished. Between 1986 and 1989 he worked as a Policy Adviser to Mark Fisher MP, Shadow Minister for the Arts. Since then he has written or edited some 18 books, contributed chapters to many others, and been responsible for researching and writing a number of influential government and independent public policy reports, including Park Life: Urban Parks & Social Renewal, People, Parks & Cities, 21st Century Libraries and Modern Hospice Design.

His study of European cemetery design, Last Landscapes, was chosen as one of the ‘Books of the Year’ by Architects' Journal, The New Statesman, and the Glasgow Sunday Herald; in The Times, books editor Erica Wagner named it as one of her Critic’s Choice of the best six books about death. His study of hospice architecture in the UK, Modern Hospice Design, was the first major study of the hospice movement in Britain from the 1960s onwards, and their influence across the world. In 2015, a reviewer for Town & Country Planning journal wrote that: ‘I’ve been forced to confront a deeper sense of spirituality in a beautiful new book called New Jerusalem: The Good City and the Good Society. It is by the hugely influential architectural critic Ken Worpole and looks as wonderful as it reads.’ In July 2021, the editor of The New Statesman wrote: ‘Worpole is a literary original, a social and architectural historian whose books combine the Orwellian ideal of common decency with understated erudition.’

Offices held 
Worpole was a founder member of the think-tank, Demos, a member of the UK Government’s Urban Green Spaces Task Force (2001 – 2002), a member of the Expert Panel of the Heritage Lottery Fund (2003 - 2008) and an Adviser to the Commission for Architecture and the Built Environment (2003 – 2008). In 2006 he was appointed as a Senior Professor at The Cities Institute, London Metropolitan University, retiring in 2011.

Honours and awards 
 1999: Honorary Doctorate awarded by Middlesex University.
 1999: Fellowship research award from the Foundation for Urban & Regional Studies.
 2012: Fellowship research award from the Leverhulme Trust.

Publications: books 
 The Republic of Letters, (edited with Dave Morley), Comedia, 1982
 Dockers & Detectives, Verso Books, 1983, revised edition Five Leaves Books, 2008
 Reading by Numbers, Comedia, 1984
 Death in the City (with Melissa Benn), Canary Books, 1986
 Saturday Night or Sunday Morning? (with Geoff Mulgan), Comedia, 1986
 Towns for People, Open University Press, 1992, reprinted 1993
 Staying Close to the River, Lawrence & Wishart, 1995
 Libraries in a World of Cultural Change, (with Liz Greenhalgh & Charles Landry), UCL Press, 1992
 Richer Futures: fashioning a new politics, (editor Ken Worpole), Earthscan, 1999
 Here Comes the Sun: architecture and public space in 20th century European culture, (with photographer Larraine Worpole), Reaktion, 2001
 Last Landscapes: the architecture of the cemetery in the West, (with photographer Larraine Worpole), Reaktion, 2003
 350 Miles: An Essex Journey, (with photographer Jason Orton), Essex County Council, 2005
 Modern Hospice Design, Routledge, 2009
 The New English Landscape, (with photographer Jason Orton), Field Station: London, 2013, reprinted 2015
 Contemporary Library Architecture, Routledge, 2015
 New Jerusalem: The Good City and the Good Society, Swedenborg Society, 2015, reprinted 2017
 So We Live: The novels of Alexander Baron (with Susie Thomas & Andrew Whitehead), Five Leaves, 2019
 No matter how many skies have fallen: back to the land in wartime Britain, Little Toller Books, 2021

References

External links 
 www.worpole.net
 The New English Landscape blog

1944 births
Living people
20th-century English non-fiction writers
Alumni of the University of Brighton
English historians
Schoolteachers from Essex
Teachers of English